The Quezon–Bicol Expressway (QBEx or QUEBEx), is a proposed  expressway that would run parallel with Maharlika Highway in the provinces of Quezon and Camarines Sur.

As of 2022, DPWH has withdrawn the proposal Quezon-Bicol Expressway (QuBex) from NEDA-ICC considering the approval of the Technical and Financial Component of the South Luzon Expressway Toll Road 5 Project by the Toll Regulatory Board.

Future exits

References 

Proposed roads in the Philippines
Roads in Quezon
Roads in Camarines Sur